Bleu or BLEU may refer to:
 
 the French word for blue
 Three Colors: Blue, a 1993 movie
 BLEU (Bilingual Evaluation Understudy), a machine translation evaluation metric
 Belgium–Luxembourg Economic Union
 Blue cheese, a type of cheese
 Parti bleu, 19th century political group in Quebec, Canada
 Bleu (blue-rare), synonymous with "extra rare", indicating a barely-cooked meat preparation; very red and cold
 Le Bleu (2001 album) album by Justin King

People
 Bleu (musician), a member of pop-group L.E.O.
 Corbin Bleu, an American actor, model, dancer and vocalist
 Deis, a character from the Breath of Fire role-playing videogame series who is known as "Bleu" in the English versions

See also
 Blue (disambiguation)
 Lebleu (disambiguation)
 Les Bleus (disambiguation)